Brand New Day is the second studio album by Australian singer and songwriter Ricki-Lee Coulter. It was released in Australia on 11 August 2007 and in Japan on 9 January 2008. Brand New Day debuted and peaked at number 37 on the ARIA Albums Chart and was certified gold by the Australian Recording Industry Association (ARIA). The album produced Coulter's most successful single to date, the lead single "Can't Touch It", which peaked at number two on the ARIA Singles Chart and was certified platinum. Its subsequent singles "Love Is All Around" and "Can't Sing a Different Song" were also ARIA top-ten hits.

Background 
Coulter travelled to New York, Los Angeles and London in February and March 2007 to begin working on her second album. Singer-songwriters and producers who worked on the album include KNS Productions, David Gamson, Marc Nelkin, Vince Pizzinga, Pete Martin and Andy Love. She also worked with Australian producers Andrew De Sylva, Audius Mtawarira and Glenn Cunningham. During this time, Coulter was still a member of the girl group Young Divas. In June 2007, it was announced that Coulter left the group to concentrate both on her solo career and then-upcoming wedding to fiancé Jamie Babbington. She explained, "I really had to get back to doing what I love doing and that's my solo career." Coulter's decision to head off to London, New York and Los Angeles in February 2007 to work on the album cited as a factor in the cancellation of plans for the Young Divas to support boy band Westlife on their Australian tour.

Singles 
"Can't Touch It" was released as the album's lead single in August 2007. It debuted and peaked at number two on the ARIA Singles Chart and was certified platinum by the Australian Recording Industry Association (ARIA) for shipments of 70,000 copies. The song spent 23 weeks in the ARIA top fifty including eight weeks in the top-ten. A digital remix extended play of the single re-titled "U Wanna Little Of This" was released on 18 May 2008 through UK record label Ministry of Sound.

Coulter covered the song "Love Is All Around" by Swedish singer Agnes Carlsson, and released it as the second single in November 2007. It debuted and peaked at number five on the ARIA Singles Chart, becoming Coulter's fourth top-ten single. The third and final single "Can't Sing a Different Song" was released in March 2008, and peaked at number eight.

Reception 
Matthew Chisling of Allmusic awarded the album three and a half out of five stars, stating "Brand New Day is a strong album, and it certainly brands Coulter in an airy-pop setting, yet it's nothing new as far as Ricki-Lee goes as an artist." The album debuted and peaked at number 37 on the ARIA Albums Chart and spent only two weeks in the ARIA top fifty. It was certified gold by the Australian Recording Industry Association (ARIA) for shipments of 35,000 copies. In October 2007, it was announced that Coulter sacked her manager Karen-Lee Goody of one year, due to poor sales of the album.

Release and promotion
Brand New Day was released by Shock Records in Australia on 11 August 2007 and in Japan on 9 January 2008 through Pony Canyon. Coulter promoted the album by opening for Hilary Duff on the Australian leg of her Dignity Tour in January 2008. Coulter embarked on her first headlining tour, The Brand New Day Tour, in March 2008.

Track listing

Personnel 
Tony Espie – mixing
Russell Fawcus – mixing assistant
Jarrad Hearman – mixing assistant
Davin Pidoto – mixing assistant
Pete Martin & the Versatile Keys – engineer, producer
Ralph McCarthy – composer
Dave Walker – mastering
Jane Dobbins – background vocals
John Roberts – trombone
David E. Williams – project coordinator
Stanley Andrews – guitar
Tim Fraser – guitar
Paul Gray – composer
Ron Blake – flugelhorn, trumpet
Lauren Brown – assistant, project coordinator, project manager, publicity
David Gamson – composer, engineer, guitar, keyboards, producer, programming
Ricki-Lee Coulter – creative director, creative producer, producer, vocals, background vocals
Vince Pizzinga – arranger, composer, guitar, bass guitar, orchestral arrangements, piano, producer, programming

Source:

Charts

Certifications

Release history

References 

2007 albums
Ricki-Lee Coulter albums
Albums produced by David Gamson
Shock Records albums
Pony Canyon albums